The men's snowboard slopestyle competition of the FIS Freestyle Ski and Snowboarding World Championships 2017 was held at Sierra Nevada, Spain on March 9 (qualifying)  and March 11 (finals). 
62 athletes from 29 countries competed.

Qualification
The following are the results of the qualification.

Heat 1

Heat 2

Final
The following are the results of the finals.

References

Snowboard slopestyle, men's